Arnott's Biscuits Limited is an Australian producer of biscuits and snack food. Founded in 1865, they are the largest producer of biscuits in Australia and a subsidiary of KKR.

History

In 1847, Scottish immigrant William Arnott opened a bakery in Morpeth, New South Wales. Later in 1865 he moved to a bakery on Hunter Street, Newcastle, providing bread, pies and biscuits for the townspeople and the ships docking at the local port. Until 1975 the company was under family control with the descendants of William Arnott, including Halse Rogers Arnott and Geoffrey H. Arnott, acting as Chairman. 

Arnott's, in common with the majority of Australian biscuit manufacturers, operated primarily in its home state, New South Wales, but has manufacturing plants in Virginia, Queensland (manufactures only plain, cream and savoury biscuits) and Shepparton, Victoria. In 1949 it merged with Morrows Pty Ltd, a Brisbane biscuit manufacturer, forming William Arnotts, Morrow Pty Ltd. In the 1960s, a series of amalgamations and acquisitions in the Australian market resulted in the creation of the Australian Biscuit Company Pty Ltd. This included Arnotts and other companies such as Brockhoff Biscuits, Arnott-Motteram and Menz in South Australia, Guest's Biscuits in Victoria, and Mills and Ware in Western Australia. The Australian Biscuit Company was later renamed Arnott's Biscuits Pty Ltd. 

In 1997, Arnott's Biscuits was subject to an extortion bid by Queenslander Joy Ellen Thomas, aged 72 years, who allegedly threatened to poison packets of Arnott's Monte Carlo biscuits in South Australia and Victoria. The company conducted a massive recall and publicity campaign, publishing the extortionist's threats and demands in full-page newspaper ads. However, Ms. Thomas was not charged with any offence as the prosecution dropped the case against her because of conflicting evidence. The recall cost the company A$22 million, but Arnott's was praised for its openness and honesty in dealing with the crisis.

In 1997, the Campbell Soup Company of North America, a shareholder of Arnott's since the 1980s, acquired Arnott's in full. Thus, in 1997, Arnott's Biscuits Ltd became a wholly owned subsidiary of the Campbell Soup Company. This caused a significant amount of controversy in Australia, based on the desire for such an Australian icon to remain in Australian hands, and a fear that Campbell's would Americanise the products.

Manufacturing of Arnott's biscuits, however, remained in Australia, and as part of a long-term expansion plan, Arnott's closed its Melbourne factory in September 2002. At the same time, it expanded its facilities in Sydney, Adelaide and Brisbane.

In 2002, Arnott's acquired Snack Foods Limited. In April 2008, Campbell Arnott's sold Arnott's Snackfoods to The Real McCoy Snackfood Co. and the company is now known as Snack Brands Australia.

In July 2019, Campbell Soup Company agreed to sell Arnott's to KKR for $US2.2 billion. Just weeks after the sale, Arnott's was in a public dispute with Woolworths Supermarkets, which reportedly wanted to charge higher prices for marketing displays. Sources said the dispute had begun in May before agreement was reached for the sale of Arnott's to KKR.

Products

Arnott's are well known in Australia and internationally for producing several quintessentially Australian biscuits. Some of their major products include:
 Adora Cream Wafers: vanilla wafers.(Discontinued)
 Arno Shortbread: traditional shortbread flavour
 Bush Biscuits: originally developed by Adelaide company W. Menz & Co., similar to an arrowroot biscuit, but larger and harder, made for camping. (Discontinued)
 Butternut Snap
 Caramel Crowns: a plain biscuit, topped with caramel, and covered in chocolate
 Cheds: a savoury cracker that is perforated and sprinkled with cheddar cheese and salt
 Chocolate Butternut Snap: a crunchy oatmeal and coconut biscuit covered in chocolate
 Chocolate Dessert: a chocolate cream sandwiched between two chocolate biscuits; discontinued in 2005 due to low sales
 Chocolate Monte: a golden syrup, honey and coconut biscuit covered in dark chocolate
 Choc Ripple: a chocolate-flavoured biscuit that is commonly used by Australian home cooks as the basis of  'Chocolate Ripple Cake or Tassie Tiramisu' by adding layers of freshly whipped cream between each layer of biscuit and covering the whole construction in more cream and is then refrigerated overnight
 Chocolate Royals: a vanilla biscuit topped with various flavours of marshmallow  coated in dark or milk chocolate, similar to the Scottish Tunnock's teacake or New Zealands mallowpuffs. The royal comes in two versions: dark chocolate (with white marshmallow) and milk chocolate (with pink marshmallow)
 Chocolate Wheaten: a product acquired after Campbell's takeover. A round, semi-sweet, whole wheat flour biscuit covered in either milk chocolate or dark chocolate. Brand acquired from George Weston Foods in 2003
 Clix: a round savoury cracker but more buttery and saltier than Jatz with a softer texture
Coconut Rings: a coconut biscuit shaped in a ring. Discontinued after Campbell's takeover
Cracker Chips: A cross between a cracker and a chip. Available in Honey Soy Chicken, Balsamic Vinegar & Sea Salt, and Three Cheese flavours.
 Creamy Chocolate: Rectangular chocolate biscuits with a hint of ginger, with vanilla cream in the middle (discontinued).
 Cruskits: a large rectangular crisp snack bread very much like Melba toast, available in Original, Corn, Light, Rice and Rye varieties
 Custard Cream: a custard cream filling sandwiched between two rectangular vanilla biscuits
 Delta Cream: two round chocolate biscuits with vanilla cream in the middle, similar to an Oreo, but sweeter and not so much cocoa
 Farmbake: Available in Chocolate Chip, Triple Choc, Chocolate Chip Fudge, Butter Shortbread, Golden Crunch, Peanut Brownie, Crunchy Oat & Fruit flavours.
 Flatbread Dippers: oven roasted flatbread crisps, introduced in 2022. Available in Olive & Fetta, Parmesan & Basil, and Sesame & Middle Eastern Spice flavours.
 Ginger Nut: A hard, crisp ginger biscuit. Arnott's manufactures four different regional varieties of ginger nut to suit the tastes of people in different states.
 Gaiety: Chocolate-coated wafers.
 Golliwog/Scalliwag: a biscuit made in the shape of the Golliwog toy, which was first sold in the 1960s and popular at that time. The name was changed to Scalliwag in the mid-1990s, however the biscuits remained in the shape of a Golliwog and the product was discontinued by the late 1990s. They made a reappearance in shops in 2010 but seem to have been removed from production again. Originally a Guest's Biscuits product.
 Goldfish: a type of snack crackers that shaped like a goldfish. (Discontinued)
 Granita
 Honey Jumbles: small soft honey gingerbread cakes, topped with pink or white icing. Discontinued in July 2021 due to low sales.
 Honey Snaps: Honey and coconut flat biscuit. (Discontinued)
 Hundreds & Thousands: a vanilla biscuit topped with pink icing and coated with tiny multicolored nonpareils.
 Iced Animals: created by the new owner Robert Arnott, animal shaped biscuits with pink, green, yellow, and orange icing on top.
 Iced VoVos: a wheat flour biscuit with a raspberry jam and fondant topping sprinkled with coconut.
 Jaffa Cakes: a soft sponge with orange jam and coated with chocolate. (Discontinued)
 Jatz: a round savoury crisp cracker, lightly salted, also available in a cracked pepper flavoured variety.
 Kingstons: small round coconut biscuits with chocolate cream in the middle.
 Lattice: (Discontinued)
 Lemon Crisps: two sweet crackers with a light sprinkling of salt and lemon cream sandwiched in between.
 Malt-O-Milk: a sweet biscuit containing malt extract, milk powder and food colour.
Marie: a sweet, vanilla-flavoured biscuit similar to a rich tea biscuit.
 Milk Coffee: a sweet biscuit with a hint of golden syrup.
 Milk Arrowroot: historical flagship biscuit brand of Arnott's, made with Arrowroot flour, but only enough that the name Arrowroot can still be used on the label, once was commonly given to babies to introduce them to solid food.
 Mint Slice: a round chocolate biscuit topped with mint flavoured cream and coated in dark chocolate. Also available in Mandarin, Tia Maria and Coconut flavours.
 Monte Carlo: a raspberry and cream fondant sandwiched between two golden syrup, honey and coconut biscuits. Widely considered the most popular within the Arnott's Assorted Cream range.
 Morning Coffee: (Discontinued)
 Nice: a sweet biscuit covered with granulated sugar.
 Obsession: chocolate biscuits, introduced in 2022. Available in Milk Chocolate, Salted Caramel, Dark Chocolate, and Mint Chocolate flavours.
 Orange Creams: two vanilla biscuits with orange cream in the middle. 
 Orange Slice: Two circular biscuits imprinted with a design based on a real orange slice, with orange cream in the middle. 
 Quatro: chocolate-coated biscuits with toppings such as fruit and nut, or caramel. Brand acquired from George Weston Foods in 2003. As of late 2010, no longer in production
 Raspberry Shortcake: a biscuit base with raspberry filling then topped with a doughnut shaped biscuit and sprinkled with granulated sugar
 SAO: a large square-shaped, plain cracker biscuit. The name may stand for "Salvation Army Officer" as the biscuit was likely made especially for the Salvation Army Officers of the day as a snack that they could carry with them on their visiting rounds.
 Salada: a salted crisp cracker, rectangular in shape but with perforations down its centre to allow it to be halved for hors d'oeuvres. Originally a Brockhoff product.
 Savoy: a crispy cracker. Originally only sold in Victoria, South Australia, and Tasmania but later available in New South Wales, the Australian Capital Territory, and Queensland. Originally a Brockhoff product.
 Scotch fingers: shortbread biscuit, also available in chocolate-coated variety.
 Sesame wheats: savoury cracker topped with toasted sesame seeds.
 Shapes: savoury chips with sprinkled flavourings. Flavours include: Barbecue, Pizza, Cheddar, Chicken Crimpy, Nacho Cheese and Cheese & Bacon.
 Shortbread creams: two vanilla shortbreads with vanilla cream in the centre.
 Shredded Wheatmeal: from the original plain biscuit line with the major addition of wheatmeal.
 Sourdough Crisps: crisps made with sourdough starter, introduced in 2022. Available in Cheddar & Roasted Garlic and Cracked Pepper & Thyme flavours. 
 Spicy Fruit Roll: a pillow shaped, spicy fruit mix covered with plain biscuit covering.  Colloquially known as the "pillow biscuit".
 Strawberry tarts: a tart base with strawberry jam in the centre.
 Teddy Bear Biscuits: biscuits shaped like a teddy bear. Also comes in a chocolate coated variety. They are a different product to Tiny Teddies. Originally a Guest's Biscuits product.
 TeeVee Snacks: a bite-sized chocolate coated biscuit, promoted as being ideal for TV snacking. Originally a Guest's Biscuits product.
 Tic Tocs: Round iced vanilla biscuits, with clock faces embossed on the underside.
 Tim Tams: a two-layered oblong chocolate-coated biscuit originally with a chocolate cream filling. Flavours now include milk chocolate, white chocolate, dark chocolate, double coating of chocolate, and caramel centre. Tim Tams are regularly released with limited edition flavours, either added as an additional layer of filling, or via flavoured chocolate.
 Tina Wafer: a sweet cream sandwiched between two light wafers. Varieties include chocolate, strawberry and vanilla.
 Tiny Teddies: thumb-sized teddy bear-shaped snacks. Practically identical to the American Nabisco brand Teddy Grahams
 Triple Wafer
 Venetians: a sweet round coconut biscuit with chewy dried currants. One side dipped in a sweet white chocolate icing.
 Vita-Weat: wholewheat crisp bread available in original and sandwich size. plain and multi-grain. Brand acquired from Peek Freans in 1982.
 Wagon Wheels: marshmallow and jam sandwiched between two large round biscuits, coated in chocolate (original variety); also now available with chocolate fudge in place of jam (double choc variety). Usually sold in packs of one. The original brand was acquired from George Weston Foods in 2003.
 Water crackers: original, sesame and cracked pepper.
 Yo-Yo: originally developed by Adelaide company W. Menz & Co., a sweet biscuit made with butter, eggs, milk and honey, originally baked by Menz in South Australia.

References

Further reading
 Boag, Charles: The Story of Arnott's Famous Biscuits: A History & A Celebration (1993), Lansdowne (Sydney). .
 Arnotts, Robert: 'The Biography of a Rich Man, Robert Arnotts - Family and Work' (1992)

External links

 
 1951 video of manufacture of biscuits, including SAOs, Iced VoVos and Monte Carlos (2 min 24 sec video with audio)

Australian brands
Manufacturing companies based in Sydney
Food and drink companies based in Sydney
Food and drink companies established in 1865
Extortion
Snack food manufacturers of Australia
Food scares
2019 mergers and acquisitions
Kohlberg Kravis Roberts companies
Australian companies established in 1865
Morpeth, New South Wales